Udamolobium is a genus of tephritid  or fruit flies in the family Tephritidae.

References

Phytalmiinae
Tephritidae genera